Pure Air is a compilation album by Agua de Annique, a band formed by the former The Gathering vocalist Anneke van Giersbergen. It was released in 2009. It contains tracks from their first album Air, and also songs featuring other artists.

Track list 
"The Blower's Daughter (feat. Danny Cavanagh from Anathema)" (Damien Rice cover) 
"Beautiful One (feat. Niels Geusebroek from Silkstone)"
"Wild Flowers" (Frank Boeijen cover) 
"Day After Yesterday (feat. Marike Jager)"
"Come Wander with Me (feat. Kyteman)" (Jeff Alexander cover) 
"Valley of the Queens (feat. Arjen Lucassen from Ayreon)" (Ayreon cover) 
"To Catch a Thief (feat. John Wetton from King Crimson & Asia)" (John Wetton & Geoff Downes cover)
"Ironic" (Alanis Morissette cover)
"What's the Reason? (feat. Niels Geusebroek from Silkstone)" (Silkstone cover) 
"Yalin"
"Somewhere (feat. Sharon den Adel from Within Temptation)" (Within Temptation cover) 
"Witnesses"
"The Power of Love" (Frankie Goes to Hollywood cover)

Personnel
Anneke van Giersbergen - vocals, piano
Joris Dirks - guitars, vocals
Jacques de Haard - bass
Rob Snijders - drums

Special guests
John Wetton
Danny Cavanagh
Arjen Anthony Lucassen
Sharon den Adel
Marike Jager
Niels Geusebroek
Kyteman
Marcel Verbeek
Svetlana Tratch
Dewi Kerstens
Ewa Albering

References

External links
 

2009 albums
Anneke van Giersbergen (band) albums